Jocelyn Bernadette Smith (born 22 August 1960) is an American jazz vocalist.

Biography 
Born in Queens, New York City, Smith received classical piano training from the age of 5. In 1980 she sang in Lenny White's funk / soul band Twennynine and went with her on a European tour. With the group Change she played in the opening act of the Electric Light Orchestra. In 1984 she moved to Berlin, where she made her first album River published 1991. In 1985 she made a guest appearance in the movie  in which she sang in the Berlin club Quasimodo. In 1987 she sang texts by William Blake for  album Tyger by Tangerine Dream. In 1986/87 she was on a world tour with Falco as a backing singer. She toured from 1984 to 1996 with her band The Married Men through central Europe (incl. three GDR tours).1996 she also sang a duet with Udo Jürgens in his song "Gib niemals auf" on his album Gestern-Heute-Morgen.

In 1999, the composer Heiner Goebbels invited her to participate as a soloist in his work Surrogate Cities. She was at the premiere and subsequent performances in 2001 in Dessau, 2002 Edinburgh and 2003 in Brisbane, Australia and in Lucerne and Berlin – just like, for example, the Berlin Philharmonic. (Later performances were with the Royal Philharmonic Orchestra in Scandinavia and Italy.)

As soprano she appeared in Mikis Theodorakis opera The Metamorphoses of Dionysus, sang duets with Maria Farantouri and released the CD Margarita with his songs. At the Berlin commemoration of 11 September 2001 (which was broadcast around the world including CNN) she interpreted the hymn "Amazing Grace".

In 2006 she performed in a television production with The 12 Cellists of the Berlin Philharmonic. In 2008, she performed with Zülfü Livanelis at the Turkish Film Festival in Nuremberg and at the Frankfurt Book Fair.

She has shown social activism in her work with choirs. She offered free singing lessons in a Kreuzberg community and neighborhood center against poverty and social exclusion "Gitschiner 15". Since April 2008, with her music project "Higher Love" – children sing for children, she supports the Action Alliance landmine.de and advocates for a worldwide ban on cluster munitions and landmines. In July 2008 she founded the non-profit association Yes We Can e.V. which campaigns for the sustainable protection and assistance of victims of war children. Yes We Can e.V. is ambassador of beBerlin campaign of 2008.

 Awards 
She sang the title song for the German version of the film The Lion King. For her CD Blue Lights and Nylons she received die Goldene Schallplatte in the category German Jazz in 2003.

 Discography 
 River, 1991
 Born of Music, 1992
 Live in Berlin, 1997
 Blue Lights & Nylon, 1998
 Margarita, 2000
 My Christmas Experience, 2001
 Back to Soul, 2002
 The Faces of Jocelyn B. Smith – Her Very Best, 2003
 Secret Place, 2004
 Phenomenal Woman, 2004 (mit Till Brönner und Tony Lakatos)
 Berlin for New Orleans, 2005
 ExpressionZZ, Live, 2006
 Pure & Natural, Direct-to-Disc, 2013
 Here I Am 2013 / Blondell 
 Boost Your Vocals 2014 / EP

 Collaborations 
 Lenny White: 29, 1980
 Tangerine Dream: Tyger, 1987
 Heiner Goebbels: Surrogate Cities, 1999 (mit David Moss)
 Eloy: The tides return forever,1994

 Compilations 
 Jo-Jo'', 2003 (Zounds, alle Titel digital remastert, 24 Karat Gold-CD)

References

External links 
 Website
 Musikprojekt Higher Love
 Yes We Can e.V.
 Portrait bei laut.de
 

1960 births
American women jazz singers
American jazz singers
Musicians from Berlin
20th-century African-American women singers
American soul singers
Living people
American expatriates in Germany
Recipients of the Cross of the Order of Merit of the Federal Republic of Germany
Recipients of the Order of Merit of Berlin
21st-century African-American people
21st-century African-American women